In the Shadow of the Dreamchild: A New Understanding of Lewis Carroll is a 1999 book by British author Karoline Leach that posited the concept of the "Carroll Myth": the idea that many of the most famous aspects of Lewis Carroll's biography, including his supposed adoration of Alice Liddell, are more legend than fact.

Its main contentions are:

 Lewis Carroll was not 'exclusively focused' on female children as has been claimed by all previous biographers.
He did not 'lose interest' in girls over the age of 14, and that many of his so-called 'child-friends' had actually been grown women.
Alice Liddell was not 'the real Alice', and that Carroll was never in love with her, or asked to marry her.
His relationships with adult women have been consistently under-examined and misreported.
 His life was haunted by an unnamed pain that may have involved a guilty love affair.

The book has had considerable impact on Carroll studies and reactions to it have been very polarised.

See also
Morton N. Cohen
Hugues Lebailly

Further reading
Ronnen, Meir. "Lewis Carroll's girls". Jerusalem Post. 20 May 1999. 
Heptonstall, Geoffrey. "In the Shadow of the Dreamchild". Contemporary Review. August 1999. Accessed 11 April 2011.
Rankin, Donald. Review. Victorian Studies 43(4): 650–653. Summer 2001.  
Shulevitz, Judith. "THE CLOSE READER; What Was on Lewis Carroll's Mind?". The New York Times. 7 April 2002. Accessed 11 April 2011.

External links
In the Shadow of the Dreamchild, website for the book

Lewis Carroll
British non-fiction literature